KASR (99.3 FM 99.3/105.5 The Eagle) is a radio station airing a classic rock format licensed to serve Atkins, Arkansas. The station serves the Morrilton, Arkansas, area and is owned by Bobby Caldwell's East Arkansas Broadcasters, through licensee EAB of Morrilton, LLC.

In 2021, EAB purchased 92.7 FM in Vilonia for $525,000. With no change in format or imaging, the call letters were switched with the new acquisition in August 2021, placing the KCON designation closer to Conway and moving the KASR call letters to the Atkins stations.

References

External links
KASR's official website

Classic rock radio stations in the United States
ASR
Radio stations established in 2000
2000 establishments in Arkansas
Pope County, Arkansas